Dakine is an American outdoor clothing company specializing in sportswear and sports equipment for adventure sports. Founded in Hawaii, the name comes from the Hawaiian Pidgin phrase "da kine" (derived from "the kind"). Now based in Hood River, Oregon (products are manufactured overseas), the company also sponsors athletes from the lifestyle and sporting fields of skiing, snowboarding, mountain biking, surfing,windsurfing, kiteboarding, and skateboarding.

History
Dakine was founded in 1979 in Haiku, Maui, Hawaii, by Rob Kaplan. In 1986 Dakine moved its base of operations to Hood River, Oregon, U.S., and has remained there since. In August 2009, Dakine was acquired by Billabong International Limited. for about US$100 million. The company moved into a new  headquarters along the Columbia River in Hood River in June 2013. Also in 2013, Billabong sold Dakine for $70 million to Altamont Capital Partners. As of 2016 Dakine has offices in Oregon, Oahu, Haiku, Tahiti, and Annecy.

Products
Dakine sells backpacks, clothing, outerwear, luggage, and accessories for men, women, and children.

Team

Surf

Skate

Snowboard

Ski

Bike
Andrew Shandro
Yoann Barelli
Cecile Ravanel
Airs Jack
Darcy Turenne
Geoff Gulevich
Graham Agassiz
James Wolf
Matthew Slaven
René Wildhaber
Steffi Marth
Thomas Vanderham
Carson Storch

Windsurf

Kite

Social compliance standard
The company has adopted the social compliance standard "Social Accountability International's SA8000"—the standard "is based on the primary international workplace rights contained within the International Labour Organisation conventions, the Universal Declaration of Human Rights and the UN Convention on the Rights of the Child."

See also
 List of companies based in Oregon

References

External links
Official Website
German Website
Polish Website
Independent Reviews

Sporting goods manufacturers of the United States
Windsurfing equipment
Kitesurfing
Companies based in Hood River, Oregon